The International Expert Group on Earth System Preservation or Institute for Earth System Preservation (IESP) is a global network of scientists, engineers, entrepreneurs, and political administrators. IESP's mission is to contribute to the further development and practical application of the concept of Earth system science and sustainability.

Focus and Mission 
IESP organizes thematic-based conferences, workshops, seminars, lectures, and publications. It serves as a liaison between experts, decision-makers, and the public to promote a mutually, beneficial exchange of concerns and knowledge, and to provide scientifically sound recommendations for action. Its activities support policy debates by providing a platform for reflection on the sustainable development of economic and societal systems in mutual relation to terrestrial and aquatic ecosystems. IESP aims to take responsibility for human impacts on the earth system, fostering the resilience of societies, economies, and ecosystems. It searches for holistic and sustainable methods that counteract threatening shortcomings in energy, water, and food supply, medical services and education.

IESP's working definition for the earth system is the considered sum of the planet´s interacting physical, chemical, biotic and societal processes. The atmosphere, hydrosphere, and cryosphere are parts of the earth system as well as the grand natural cycles (carbon cycle, nitrogen cycle, phosphorus cycle and sulfur cycle) including the water cycle. All living organisms, including humans and their activities, are an integral part of the earth system. The growing human population, however, seriously challenges the interaction of the system´s components and dynamics.

Advancing solutions to maintain the resilience of the grand living conditions on planet Earth is the main interest of IESP's members. Therefore, IESP organizes interdisciplinary, discussion-based workshops following the Dahlem Conferences. Informed by the latest scientific knowledge, expert advice is presented to decision-makers of economic and political institutions, and the general public in the form of memoranda.

History 
In 2002, the Institute of Advanced Studies on Sustainability (IoS) was founded as a center of excellence in the field of environmental sciences and technology of the European Academy of Sciences and Arts (EASA). It is a registered non-profit organization at the magistrate court of the City of Munich, Germany.

Following the workshop “The Art of Dealing Wisely with the Planet Earth,” IoS established the International Expert Group on the Preservation of the Functionality of the Earth System as part of its activities in 2008. Discussions are summarized in the Zugspitze Declaration. Since then, IESP is associated with the Institute of Advanced Study (IAS) of the Technical University Munich (TUM) in Garching. Established to support innovative, "high-risk, high-reward" topics through interdisciplinary initiatives, TUM-IAS brings together researchers from TUM with distinguished scholars from around the world.

Organization 
IESP is a registered nonprofit association and a collaborating institute of the European Academy of Sciences and Arts (EASA). An elected executive board legally represents IESP, its general assembly functions as the decision-making body, its members are from the European Union, US, China, and Russia.

Partners 
Club of Rome EU Chapter
Chinese Research Academy of Environmental Sciences (CRAES)
European Academy of Sciences and Arts
Institute for Advanced Sustainability Studies, Potsdam (IASS)
Institute for Advanced Study, Technical University Munich (TUM-IAS)

References

External links 
 www.iesp.de
 www.ias.tum.de
 www.tum.de

Earth system sciences
Sustainability organizations